Nadezhda Ralldugina (born 15 November 1957) is a retired female middle distance runner who represented the USSR in the 1980s. She set her personal best in the women's 1,500 metres (3:56.63) on 1984-08-18 at a meet in Prague.

Achievements

References
Profile

1957 births
Living people
Soviet female middle-distance runners
Russian female middle-distance runners
Friendship Games medalists in athletics